The 1986 Australian Grand Prix was a Formula One motor race held on 26 October 1986 at the Adelaide Street Circuit, Adelaide, Australia. It was the sixteenth and final race of the 1986 Formula One World Championship. The race decided a three-way battle for the Drivers' Championship between Brit Nigel Mansell, driving a Williams-Honda; his Brazilian teammate Nelson Piquet; and Frenchman Alain Prost, driving a McLaren-TAG.

Mansell took pole position for the race, but a poor start off the grid enabled teammate Piquet, Ayrton Senna and Keke Rosberg to overtake him and demote him to fourth by the end of the first lap.

A few laps into the race, Finland's Keke Rosberg, in his final Grand Prix, took the lead from Piquet. However, the Finn retired with a puncture on lap 63, handing the lead back to Piquet and elevating Mansell into third place, which would have been sufficient to secure the championship. One lap later, Mansell's race ended  as his left-rear tyre exploded on the main straight with 19 laps remaining. The title was then between Piquet and Prost with the latter needing to finish ahead of the former to successfully defend his title. Following the tyre failures of Rosberg and Mansell, the Williams team called Piquet in for a precautionary tyre change leaving him 15 seconds behind. He made a late charge to close the gap to 4.2 seconds but Prost took victory to win his second of four titles.

It was not until the 2007 Brazilian Grand Prix that there were again three possible drivers' title contenders entering the final race of the season.

Background
Going into the race, three drivers were in contention for the World Championship. Nigel Mansell, driving a Williams-Honda, led with 70 points, while reigning champion Alain Prost, driving a McLaren-TAG, was second on 64 and Mansell's teammate Nelson Piquet was third on 63.

The Williams-Honda was superior in speed to the McLaren-TAG, with Mansell and Piquet having won nine of the previous fifteen races between them, and the team sealing the Constructors' Championship at the Portuguese Grand Prix in late September. However, Mansell and Piquet had been battling with one another and had taken points from each other on a number of occasions, while Prost's consistency had seen him accumulate points all year and thus remain in touch with the Williams drivers.

Nonetheless, Mansell went into the race in the strongest position among the three drivers, needing only to finish third or higher to take the title, while Prost and Piquet both needed to win to have any chance.

Qualifying report
Qualifying saw Mansell take pole position from teammate Piquet by 0.3 seconds, with Ayrton Senna third in his Lotus, a further 0.2 seconds back. Prost was fourth but 1.2 seconds behind Mansell, followed by René Arnoux in the Ligier and Gerhard Berger in the Benetton. Completing the top ten were Keke Rosberg in the second McLaren, Philippe Alliot in the second Ligier, Michele Alboreto in the Ferrari and Philippe Streiff in the Tyrrell. Andrea de Cesaris surprised by taking eleventh, the best grid position for the Minardi team up to this point, ahead of Stefan Johansson in the second Ferrari, Teo Fabi in the second Benetton and Johnny Dumfries in the second Lotus.

Qualifying classification

Race report
The prospect of a three-way battle for the Drivers' Championship crown attracted a capacity crowd of 150,000 to the Adelaide circuit.

Mansell yielded the lead to Senna's Lotus at the second corner on lap 1 and fell behind both Piquet and Rosberg on the same lap. Piquet also overtook Senna on lap 1 to take the lead but it would last only six laps as on lap 7, Rosberg took the lead from Piquet and began to build a sizeable gap between himself and the rest of the field.

On lap 23 Piquet spun, although no damage was sustained to the car, and he continued the race despite dropping back several places. Prost suffered a puncture a few laps later and he dropped to fourth position after having to pit. Piquet charged back through the field, passing Mansell for second place on lap 44, but Prost closed on the two Williams cars and, with 25 laps to go, all three championship contenders were running together in positions 2, 3 and 4.

The battle became one for the lead on lap 63 when Rosberg suffered a right rear tyre failure and retired from the race.  Rosberg later revealed that he would never have won the race anyway unless Prost failed to finish or had sufficient problem not to be able to challenge, as he had promised Prost and the team that he would give best to his teammate to help his bid to win back-to-back championships. Prost had just passed Mansell for third which became second when Rosberg retired, with Piquet now leading. Mansell only needed a third-place finish to win the championship.

The Williams coasted to a stop in the run-off area at the end of the straight, Mansell managing to avoid hitting anything. Fearing the same happening to the second car, Williams called Piquet to the pits and Prost took the lead. Piquet would make a late charge, closing the gap from 15.484 seconds with 2 laps remaining to just 4.205 at the finish and Prost claimed both the race and the World Championship. Prost had so little fuel left that he pulled up only metres past the finish line.

In his last race for Ferrari, Johansson completed the podium in third place, albeit a lap down on Prost and Piquet. Martin Brundle ran out of fuel as he crossed the line in fourth place in his Tyrrell. His teammate Streiff finished fifth, two laps down, with Dumfries taking the final point in his Lotus.

By winning, Prost became the first and so far only driver to ever win the Australian Grand Prix in both non-championship and World Championship form, having won the non-championship 1982 Australian Grand Prix run for Formula Pacific cars at the Calder Park Raceway in Melbourne.

It was also the last F1 race for two former World Champions,  champion Alan Jones and  champion Rosberg, as well as the last race for Patrick Tambay, Dumfries, Allen Berg and Huub Rothengatter, and for Team Haas, whom both Jones and Tambay drove for.

Race classification

Championship standings after the race
 Bold text indicates the World Champions.

Drivers' Championship standings

Constructors' Championship standings

References

Grand Prix
Australian Grand Prix
Australian Grand Prix
Motorsport in Adelaide
Australian Grand Prix